This, That and the Other, originally released as A Promise of Bed, is a 1969 British sex comedy, featuring a trilogy of stories. The cast included Victor Spinetti, Dennis Waterman, John Bird, Vanessa Howard, Vanda Hudson, Alexandra Bastedo and Valerie Leon.

Plot
Story 1 - Susan Stress (Vanda Hudson), a sex-crazed actress desperate for a role in a film, lures the producer's son (Dennis Waterman) into her apartment by persuading him to take raunchy photographs of her.
Story 2 - George (Victor Spinetti), a depressed loner on the brink of suicide, receives a visit from a young hippy girl (Vanessa Howard), who brings her friends to his apartment after believing it to be the location of a swinging party with a suicide theme.
Story 3 - A lascivious taxi driver (John Bird) takes a mysterious sexy girl (Yutte Stensgaard) to an isolated countryside retreat, and becomes involved in a psychedelic world of bizarre hallucinations.

Cast
Victor Spinetti - George 
Dennis Waterman - Photographer 
John Bird - Taxi Driver 
Vanessa Howard - Barbara 
Vanda Hudson - Susan Stress 
Gordon Sterne  - Producer
Peter Kinsley - Wilbur 
Roy Brannigan - Jeffrey 
Alexandra Bastedo - Angie 
Christopher Mitchell  - Carl 
Yutte Stensgaard - Taxi Girl
Angela Grant - Flower Girl
Valerie Leon - Bath Girl
Cleo Goldstein - Hands girl

References

External links
 
 A Promise of Bed at BFI

1969 films
British sex comedy films
1960s sex comedy films
1969 comedy films
1960s English-language films
Films directed by Derek Ford
1960s British films